Ridge Grove is a historic apartment building at 1112 Grove Street in Evanston, Illinois. The three-story brick building was built in 1928. Architect Edward M. Sieja designed the building, which incorporates geometric and Neoclassical elements. The building features a projecting section across most of its front facade, sidelights and a fan around the entrance, limestone trim, and piers at its corners. The lobby includes a mock fireplace to resemble the foyer of a house.

The building was added to the National Register of Historic Places on March 15, 1984.

References

External links

Buildings and structures on the National Register of Historic Places in Cook County, Illinois
Residential buildings on the National Register of Historic Places in Illinois
Buildings and structures in Evanston, Illinois
Apartment buildings in Illinois
Residential buildings completed in 1928